The Alcmeonis (Alkmeonis, or , Alkmaiōnis)  is a lost early Greek epic which is considered to have formed part of the Theban cycle. There are only seven references to the Alcmeonis in ancient literature, and all of them make it clear that the authorship of the epic was unknown. It told the story of Alcmaeon's killing of his mother Eriphyle for having arranged the death of his father Amphiaraus, whose murder was narrated in the Thebaid. One of the surviving fragments is quoted by Athenaeus in the Deipnosophistae: he chose it because it describes a funeral banquet. The lines have very little in common with descriptions of feasts in the Iliad and Odyssey.

Works that mention the Alcmeonis 
Pseudo-Apollodorus. The Library: in Two Volumes. Trans. James George Frazer. Cambridge: Harvard University Press, 1976.

Select editions and translations

Critical editions
 .
 .
 .
 .

Translations
 . (The link is to the 1st edition of 1914.) English translation with facing Greek text; now obsolete except for its translations of the ancient quotations.
 . Greek text with facing English translation

References

Bibliography
 .

1st-millennium BC books
Ancient Greek epic poems
Theban Cycle
Lost poems
Works of unknown authorship